The Wildest! is an album by Louis Prima, first released in 1956. It features singer Keely Smith with saxophonist Sam Butera and the Witnesses.

Background
Louis Prima was a well-known 1930s and 1940s trumpeter and singer who had a moderate series of hit singles at that time. He initially gained popularity in his home city of New Orleans and later in New York. By 1954, Prima had joined a Louisiana band led by Sam Butera. With Prima's stage partner and wife Keely Smith, he, Butera and the Witnesses secured a gig at the Sahara Hotel and Casino in Las Vegas. They soon became the most popular act in that city.

On April 19, 1956 the band gathered at the casino lounge to record tracks for the album. Capitol Records attempted to retain Prima's "in person" performance and spirit to capture what he referred to as "three o'clock in the morning at the Sahara" with the group. One of the songs recorded, "Jump, Jive, an' Wail" would become a hit through Brian Setzer's cover version in 1998.

The Wildest! was reissued on August 13, 2002 by producer Michael Cuscuna. The album contains four additional tracks recorded on September 13, 1956 as well as new liner notes by the producer.

Reception
Allmusic expressed that "The Wildest! is the gem of Louis Prima's catalogue. None of his other efforts transcend its raunchy mix of demented gibberish, blaring sax, and explosive swing, which rocked as hard as anything released at the time." The album is considered a collection of Prima's signature recordings.

The Wildest! is noted in the book 1001 Albums You Must Hear Before You Die. In it, critic Will Fulford-Jones states, "this is simply irrepressible music that more than matches its cover shot. Prima is joyous, rumbustious, and irresistible."

Track listing

Personnel
Louis Prima - vocals, trumpet
Keely Smith - vocals
Sam Butera - tenor saxophone
James Blount, Jr. - trombone
Willie McCumber - piano
Jack Marshall - guitar
Amato Rodrigues - bass guitar
Bobby Morris - drums

References

External links
Official Louis Prima website

1956 albums
Albums produced by Michael Cuscuna
Albums produced by Voyle Gilmore
Albums recorded at Capitol Studios
Capitol Records albums
Louis Prima albums